Ulf Patrik Burman (born ) is a Swedish wheelchair curler.

He participated at the 2010 Winter Paralympics where Swedish team won a bronze medal.

Wheelchair curling teams and events

References

External links 

Profile at the Official Website for the 2010 Winter Paralympics in Vancouver

Living people
1968 births
Swedish male curlers
Swedish wheelchair curlers
Paralympic wheelchair curlers of Sweden
Wheelchair curlers at the 2010 Winter Paralympics
Medalists at the 2010 Winter Paralympics
Paralympic bronze medalists for Sweden
Paralympic medalists in wheelchair curling
Place of birth missing (living people)
20th-century Swedish people